Kevin Moore (born 20 October 1957) is an English former professional association football who played as a midfielder. Moore made 18 appearances in the Football League for Shrewsbury Town between 1974 and 1978, and also played non-league football for Telford United.

References

1957 births
Living people
English footballers
Shrewsbury Town F.C. players
Telford United F.C. players
English Football League players
Association football midfielders